Polytechnic Institute Ground or Narshingarh Cricket Ground is a multi-use stadium in Agartala, India.  It is used mostly for cricket matches.

When it was built in 1989–90 it had the first turf pitch in Tripura. The ground is located at the Tripura Institute of Technology at Narsingarh, a suburb of Agartala, two kilometres from the Agartala Airport.

References

External links
 Cricinfo Website – Ground Page
 cricketarchive Website – Ground Page
 CricHQ

University sports venues in India
Cricket grounds in Tripura
Sports venues in Agartala
Sports venues completed in 1989
1989 establishments in Tripura
20th-century architecture in India